From 1952 to 1980 French psychoanalyst and psychiatrist Jacques Lacan gave an  annual seminar in Paris. The Books of the Seminar are edited by Jacques-Alain Miller.

History 
In 1951, Lacan, then a member of the Paris Psychoanalytic Society, initiated a series of weekly Wednesday meetings in his apartment on Rue de Lille, Paris. In 1952, the meetings were transferred to the Sainte-Anne Hospital where Lacan worked as a consultant psychiatrist. Book I of the seminar is the edited transcription of the 1953–1954 weekly lessons at Sainte-Anne, where the Seminar would be held until 1963.

The final seminar to be held at Sainte-Anne is published as Book X (Anxiety, 1962–1963). The single lesson delivered on 20 November 1963 and published as "Introduction to the Names-of-the-Father Seminar" is the introduction to a seminar that was never delivered, and which has thus been dubbed The Inexistent Seminar. Indeed, the night before this lesson, Lacan had been informed that the SFP "had voted, in a complicated procedure, to refuse to ratify the motion striking Lacan's name from the list of the training analysts", thus stripping Lacan of the right to continue as a training analyst within the International Psychoanalytical Association. This institutional manoeuvre effectively brought to a close the early period of Lacan's teaching.

The middle period of Lacan's teaching began two months later with The Four Fundamental Concepts of Psychoanalysis. Hosted by the École Normale Supérieure, under the patronage of the School for Advanced Studies in the Social Sciences, the Seminar now enjoyed "a much larger audience" and represented a "change of front". This series of lessons, now edited as Book XI of the Seminar, opens with the lesson "Excommunication" in which Lacan expands on the circumstances and implications of his exclusion from the IPA. The second lesson, "The Freudian Unconscious and Ours" sets the tone of his ensuing teaching by indicating potential points of discontinuity with respect to Freud's oeuvre.

Lacan's yearly Seminar continued at the École normale supérieure until 1969. From autumn 1969 onwards, it was hosted by the Law Faculty at Place du Panthéon. This series of seminars, the late period of Lacan's teaching, opened with The Other Side of Psychoanalysis, now edited as Book XVII of the Seminar, and continued until the late seventies.

As Lacan's teaching moved into the phase known as the very late teaching of Lacan, his declining health led to less regular appointments. Lacan's final public delivery on 12 July 1980, sometimes referred to as "The Caracas Seminar" was not, as this title indicates, part of the Parisian series.

Transcription 
From the very first seminar at Sainte-Anne, the weekly sessions were recorded by a shorthand typist. For two decades, copies of these typescripts were the only available record of Lacan's oral teaching, Lacan himself having declined the various offers extended to him to have the typescripts edited into publishable volumes.

In the early seventies, Jacques-Alain Miller offered some indications as to what would constitute an effective editorial strategy and at Lacan's invitation drew up a transcription of the twenty lessons that made up the eleventh seminar, The Four Fundamental Concepts of Psychoanalysis delivered in 1964. The result pleased Lacan, and François Wahl at Éditions du Seuil was happy to publish.

Seminar XI was published in 1973. In his "Postface", Lacan writes: "A transcription, now here is a word I am discovering thanks to the modesty of J. A. M., Jacques-Alain Miller by name: what gets read passes through the writing whilst surviving there intact". Lacan had said to Miller, "we will sign it together", but Miller had preferred to opt for a more discreet "Text established by…", a nod to the editing credits to the Greek and Latin texts in the Collection Budé.

Both Lacan and Wahl were keen for more seminars to be published and Lacan entrusted the task to Miller. Four more books of the Seminar were published during Lacan's lifetime. The first to be translated into English was Book XI, published by Hogarth Press in 1977 with a specially written preface. To date (2015), seventeen of the seminars have been published in French, several of which have also appeared in English translation. The remaining seminars have all been established by Miller and are currently awaiting publication. As of 2013, the Books of the Seminar will be published by Éditions de la Martinière.

Chronological list

References

External links 
 The Seminars of Jacques Lacan
 No Subject, an online encyclopedia of Lacanian psychoanalysis
 Lacan Dot Com Weekly Seminar details

Books about the philosophy of sexuality
Lacan
Post-structuralism
Structuralism
Postmodern theory
Works by Jacques Lacan
Philosophy of psychology